Robert Perceval  was an Anglican priest in  the 16th-century.

Rogers was Rector of Risley. He was appointed Archdeacon of Chester in 1559 but deprived by Queen Elizabeth.

References

Archdeacons of Chester
16th-century English people